Dinner is a 2016 Nigerian  comedy Film that is all about love, betrayal and forgiveness. It was produced by Jay Franklyn Jituboh and Chris Odeh. The executive producer of the film is David Jituboh. It was released November 11, 2016 and premiered at IMAX Cinema at Lekki. The premier of Dinner was sponsored by Amstel Malta and attended by celebrities in movie industry. Despite that the movie received mixed criticism, it is  still one of the entertaining Nollywood movies.

Cast 

 Okey Uzoeshi as Mike Okafor
 Enyinna Nwigwe as Adetunde George Jnr
 Kehinde Bankole as Lola Coker
 Keira Hewatch as Diane Bassey

Other actors in the film include Deyemi Okanlawon, Kehinde Bankole, RMD and Ireti Doyle.

Plot 
Adetunde George jnr invited his bosom friend, Mike Okafor to his place to spend  weekend with him and his fiancee Lola Coker who is staying with him to plan for their wedding. Mike Okafor also brought along his girlfriend Diane Bassey so as to propose to her. Things went up north when secrets about their relationship leaked out.

See also 
List of Nigerian actors

Beyond blood

Blood sisters (2022 series)

References 

2016 films
Nigerian comedy films
English-language Nigerian films